Hurricane Kate was the latest Atlantic hurricane to form in the Atlantic basin since Epsilon in 2005, as well as one of the northernmost November hurricanes on record. The eleventh and final named storm and hurricane of the 2015 Atlantic hurricane season, Kate formed out of a disorganized tropical wave that had moved off the coast of Africa on October 30. Unfavorable conditions prevented it from significantly organizing as it traversed the Atlantic. Once it neared the northern coast of Hispaniola on November 7, it began to become somewhat better organized. The next day it developed into a tropical depression; shortly afterwards it developed into Tropical Storm Kate. Kate moved northwest around an area of high pressure, gradually strengthening. On November 11, it intensified into a hurricane while simultaneously peaking in intensity. Shortly afterwards, it transitioned into an extratropical cyclone.

Kate caused minor impacts in the Bahamas, other than gusty winds and some rain showers as it passed just to the east on November 9. It also caused minor surf along the East Coast of the United States.

Meteorological history

On October 30, a poorly-defined tropical wave moved off the coast of Africa with little thunderstorm activity. At this point in the season, tropical waves are uncommon due to increasingly unfavourable conditions, making the origins of Kate "rare, but not unprecedented" as described by the National Hurricane Center (NHC) in its post-season report on the storm. Passing through the eastern Atlantic in unfavourable conditions, the disorganized disturbance failed to organize any further. By November 5, however, as the wave approached the Lesser Antilles, a low-level vorticity split from the wave and traveled to the west-northwest, while the tropical wave headed towards Central America. The new disturbance then turned towards Hispaniola and Puerto Rico, at which point the National Hurricane Center began to monitor the disturbance for possible tropical cyclogenesis. On November 7, convection increased as it passed to the northeast of Hispaniola; however, surface pressures were still relatively high. By early on November 8, showers and convection became more concentrated around the area of low pressure, and there was indications that the disturbance was producing gale-force winds in squally bands that were short-lived. It is estimated that Tropical Depression Twelve formed at around 18:00 UTC, after further organization occurred, while located north of the Turks and Caicos Islands. The depression moved to the west in response to an area of high pressure that was situated to its north. Banding features began to develop along with a defined outflow pattern, and after an Air Force reconnaissance aircraft investigated the system on November 9, the depression was upgraded to Tropical Storm Kate at 15:00 UTC that day.

The overall size of Kate was initially relatively small, with a compact central dense overcast (CDO) extending only  from the center of the storm. However, observations reported that the circulation of Kate was very small and did not register in some of the operating stations. By the early morning hours of November 10, Kate began to turn to the north in response to a trough that was coming off the East Coast of the United States. Shortly thereafter, Kate strengthened to just below hurricane intensity with winds of 70 mph (110 km/h), and was initially predicted to become a hurricane shortly thereafter before passing over cooler sea surface temperatures, however intensification briefly halted. By 00:00 UTC on November 11, Kate had intensified into a hurricane as it began to accelerate northeast into and become embedded into the mid-latitude westerlies, after a microwave pass revealed banding features had become more defined near the center. This made it the latest-forming hurricane in the Atlantic basin since Hurricane Epsilon in 2005. Shortly afterwards, Kate reached its peak intensity with winds of 85 mph (140 km/h) and a pressure of a  based on continued improvement of its satellite presentation. Afterwards, colder waters and increasing wind shear caused Kate to weaken, and it transitioned into an extratropical cyclone by 00:00 UTC on November 12. The remnants of Kate continued to accelerate over the North Atlantic Ocean for another day before slowing down dramatically and turning eastwards before being absorbed by a larger cyclone on November 13.

Preparations and impact

Eastern Caribbean 
The precursor to Kate dropped heavy rainfall on Martinique from November 5 through 7. No fatalities were reported.

The Bahamas

Still recovering from the destruction of Hurricane Joaquin nearly a month prior, residents were advised on November 8, before Kate had  formed, to take more precautions in the event that warnings were issued. New shelters were opened for the expected areas to be impacted by the then-precursor to Kate.  Ahead of the storm, on November 9, a tropical storm warning was issued for the northern portions of the Bahamas as Kate was expected to pass fairly close to the island chain. However, effects were not as bad as expected, due to the storm's circulation being very small. Because of this, some islands did not even report tropical storm-force winds as Kate passed to the east. The warnings were later discontinued as the storm moved away from the area.

On November 9, the National Emergency Management Agency (NEMA) announced that they would closely monitor the progress of the tropical storm, after a Level II Activation code was put into effect. NEMA Captain Stephen Russell advised residents that local administrators had been informed of the impending storm, to enforce that local disaster committees were prepared, and to have shelters opened, in case an evacuation needed to be ordered for low-lying areas, partially those near the outskirts of the island. In northern Eleuthera, the Glass Window Bridge was shut down in advance of tropical storm conditions. One of the airline services in the Bahamas, Bahamasair, later stated that a flight from Nassau to San Salvador would be delayed by day to early on November 10 due to the weather conditions. Further changes regarding flights to other areas in the Bahamas were stated as being issued in the case that conditions worsened.

That same day, public schools in Cat Island and San Salvador were closed due to the passing of Kate just to the north, advising students and staff to remain safe. In addition, schools in Eleuthera also closed at noon in advance.

Bermuda
Only high surf and some outer bands from Kate impacted Bermuda as it accelerated to the north, which was still recovering from Hurricane Joaquin that had passed just west of the island in early October. No damage or deaths were reported.

Europe
By November 16, the remnants of Kate had already begun to affect the United Kingdom, where some damage was reported. In Wales, high winds from the system knocked  down numerous trees, and heavy rain caused flash flooding, which covered roadways.

The area of Donegal reported that a bridge had vanished due to the rising tides. Some people even woke to find their cars destroyed in the flood. Multiple road closures had to be put in place due to the heavy rainfall and floods. Rivers were also reported to have burst their banks, with one river, the River Deel, overflowed and flooded into the city of Crossmolina around 6:30 a.m local time on November 15.

See also

Other tropical cyclones named Kate
Timeline of the 2015 Atlantic hurricane season
Hurricane Joaquin – earlier 2015 storm that had severely impacted the Bahamas and coastal Portugal about a month prior to Kate.
Tropical Storm Franklin (2005)

References

Kate (2015)
Kate (2015)
Kate (2015)
Kate (2015)
November 2015 events
Kate